Nawzad Hadi Mawlood is the former Governor of Erbil Province. Hadi was born in Erbil in 1963, and he took over as governor in 2004.
Nawzad Hadi resigned from being governor on the 10th of September 2019 and was replaced by Firsat Sofi Ali. He was one of the main heads of the PDK in Erbil.

References

Living people
1963 births
Governors of Erbil Governorate
People from Erbil
Kurdish politicians